The Privateer Yacht Club is a private yacht club located in Hixson, Tennessee, on the shore of Chickamauga Lake (United States).

The club is also the home site of the University of Tennessee at Chattanooga Sailing Team for intercollegiate sailing at the South Atlantic Intercollegiate Sailing Association.

Privateer Yacht Club has a facility that includes twenty eight acres, a clubhouse, one boat ramp and a dinghy hoist, wet slip docks for 80 sailboats, 110 dry slips for “dry sailed” boats and/or trailers, two maintenance hoists, a covered rack for a dozen kayaks, and a -mile wooded trail.

History 
Privateer Yacht Club was organized on July 25, 1940, after the Chickamauga Dam was built, by a group of Snipe sailors.

Fleets 
At the present time there are One-Design racing fleets of Catalina 22, MC Scow, Flying Scot and Snipe, besides CR-914 Radio-controlled and cruising fleets.

References

External links 
 Official website

1940 establishments in Tennessee
Sailing in Tennessee
Yacht clubs in the United States